The 1988–89 Argentine Primera B Nacional was the 3rd. season of second division professional of football in Argentina. A total of 22 teams competed; the champion and runner-up were promoted to Argentine Primera División. Chaco For Ever (champion) and Unión (SF) (winner of "Torneo Dodecagonal" after beating arch-rival Colón in a two-legged series) promoted to Primera División.

On the other hand, Chacarita Juniors, Temperley, and Estación Quequén (Necochea) were relegated to Primera B.

Club information

Standings
Chaco For Ever was declared champion and was automatically promoted to Primera División, and the teams placed 2nd to 10th qualified for the Second Promotion Playoff.

Second Promotion Playoff
The Second Promotion Playoff or Torneo Reducido was played by the teams placed 2nd to 10th in the overall standings: Lanús (2nd) who entered in the Semifinals, Unión (3rd) who entered in the Second Round, Almirante Brown (4th) Huracán (5th) Colón (6th), Belgrano (7th), Defensa y Justicia (8th), Talleres (RE) (9th) and Sportivo Italiano (10th); the champion of Primera B Metropolitana: Villa Dálmine,  Atlético de Rafaela and Olimpo, both winners of Zonales Noroeste y Sureste from Torneo del Interior. The winner was promoted to Primera División.

1: Qualified because of sport advantage.

Relegation

Note: Clubs with indirect affiliation with AFA are relegated to their respective league of his province according to the Argentine football league system, while clubs directly affiliated face relegation to Primera B Metropolitana. Clubs with direct affiliation are all from Greater Buenos Aires, with the exception of Newell's, Rosario Central, Central Córdoba and Argentino de Rosario, all from Rosario, and Unión and Colón from Santa Fe.

Relegation Playoff Matches
Each tie was played on a home-and-away two-legged basis, but if the first match was won by the team of Primera B Nacional (who also played the first leg at home), there was no need to play the second. If instead, the team from the Regional leagues wins the first leg, the second leg must be played, leg that, if its won by the team of Primera B Nacional, a third leg must be played, if the third leg finishes in a tie, the team from Primera B Nacional remains on it.
This season, Deportivo Maipú had to play against Gutiérrez Sport Club from the Liga Mendocina de fútbol.

Deportivo Maipú remains in Primera B Nacional.

Top scorers

See also
1988–89 in Argentine football

References

Primera B Nacional seasons
Prim
1988 in South American football leagues
1989 in South American football leagues